Thomas Patrick Callaghan "T.P. Callaghan" (born 1938) in "Bailieborough" was a long distance runner. Callaghan was a popular long distance runner in the 1950s and 1960s who ran in both cross country and road races throughout Ireland and also represented Ireland on many occasions in races all over Europe.  He was the first winner of the Cavan Cross Country Cup.

References

Irish male long-distance runners
1938 births
Living people